People v. Berry is a voluntary manslaughter case that is widely taught in American law schools for the appellate courts unusual interpretation of heat of passion doctrine. Although the defendant had time to "cool down" between his wife's verbal admission of infidelity and the killing, the California Supreme Court held that the provocation in this case was adequate to reduce a murder charge to manslaughter. The lower court had relied on the traditional definition of "adequate provocation" in its jury instructions. The California Supreme Court reversed Berry's murder conviction, while affirming Berry's conviction for assault using deadly force.

The case has also been discussed or mentioned in more than forty separate academic journal articles relating to murder, female victims of domestic violence, and rape.   More than 160 court decisions in California have cited, mentioned, or discussed this opinion.

Background
Voluntary manslaughter is a form of homicide where a defendant's culpability is mitigated by an "adequate provocation", thereby resulting in a lesser sentence than a murder charge. Traditionally, at common law, manslaughter was limited to certain categories of actions, but by the time the Berry case was decided in 1976 the categorical approach had been broadened to include verbal provocation, and the court notes in the decision that "no specific type of provocation is required" and "verbal provocation may be sufficient."

Although Berry did not change the law of manslaughter at the time, instead applying a previous precedent Borchers, it is taught in most first-year law courses as an example of how the doctrine of provocation developed and moved away from the "no cooling period" requirement that had traditionally been a requirement for manslaughter.

Facts 

Albert Joseph Berry was charged with murdering his wife, Rachel Pessah. The couple married in May 1974; Ms. Pessah was 26 years younger than Berry, and a recent immigrant from Israel.  Three days after their wedding Rachel left for Israel, where she stayed for six weeks. Upon her return, she told her husband, Berry, that she had fallen in love with a man named Yako. The court summarized the facts leading up to Rachel's killing as "a tormenting two weeks in which Rachel alternately taunted defendant with her involvement with Yako and at the same time sexually excited defendant". The crime was committed two weeks after Rachel first admitted the infidelity to her husband. Between Rachel's admission and the homicide, Berry had left the apartment and spent time with friends. When he returned to the apartment, Rachel wasn't home. Rachel returned home the next morning, on July 26, 1974. When Berry tried to talk to Rachel, she started screaming, and that was when he strangled her with a telephone cord. Police arrested Albert Joseph Berry for her murder on August 1, 1974.

Procedural history
The defendant was charged under § 187 of the California Penal Code. He was convicted of first degree murder by a jury. This defense appealed the murder conviction on the grounds that the trial court failure to instruct the jury on voluntary manslaughter was a reversible error. The defense claimed that a voluntary manslaughter instruction should have been given for both heat of passion and diminished capacity. The appeals court granted an appeal only for the heat of passion claim.

Issue
The issue decided in the case was whether taunts and provocation over a period of time could be adequate provocation for heat of passion manslaughter.

Appellate court's decision 
The court reversed the first-degree murder conviction, explaining that the question of whether the defendant had acted under the heat of passion should have properly been resolved by the jury. Relying on a previous case People v. Borchers the court wrote that "evidence of admissions of infidelity by the defendant's paramour, taunts directed to him and other conduct, 'supports a finding that the defendant killed in wild desperation induced by (the woman's) long, continued provocatory conduct'. 

Prosecutors argued that manslaughter was not applicable because there had been a "cooling period" between the initial admission and the homicide, but the court rejected the argument writing that "the long course of provocatory conduct...reached its final culmination in the apartment when Rachel began screaming". Wayne LaFave has described this as rekindling an earlier passion, writing that the Court found that Pessah's screaming was "sufficient to rekindle passion regarding her earlier confession of adultery".  

A prominent psychiatrist, Dr. Martin Blinder, had testified at trial that the victim was suicidal and that her taunting of Berry was an attempt to provoke him into killing her.  He also testified that the long course of psychological torment she inflicted on Berry would have produced the same type of blind, uncontrollable rage traditionally associated with "heat of passion" defenses.

Other information 

The lead prosecutor in this case was Evelle J. Younger.  The defense attorney on appeal was Edward W. Suman.

Transcripts of testimonies from the trial, which have been reviewed by law professor Donna Coker contain additional facts that the California Supreme Court did not include in their decision. The defendant, Berry, had a history of intimate violence and before his marriage to Pessah, had stabbed his second wife eleven times after she called out another man's name during sex. Berry had also admitted to police that he "deliberately waited to kill [Rachel]. No pretense, no bullshit, no nothing."

Two years passed before the California Supreme Court remanded the case for a new trial. Berry's trial attorney, public defender Geoffrey Brown had obtained Pessah's hospital records for psychiatric treatment she had received after a previous incident where Berry had strangled. The records provided details about Pessah's relationship with Yacob, and supported Dr. Blinder's testimony about Rachel's depression. The defense accepted a plea agreement for second degree murder, which carried a minimum 5 year sentence.

References

External links

California state case law
1976 in United States case law
1976 in California
United States manslaughter case law
Adultery in law